Summerfield School (or similar spellings) could mean:

 Summerfield Schools public school district in Petersburg, Michigan, U.S.
 Summerfield High School in Summerfield, Louisiana, U.S.
 Summer Fields School, New Delhi in India
 Summer Fields School in Summertown, Oxford, U.K.
 Summerfield School Gymnasium and Community Center,  Summerfield, Guilford County, North Carolina, U.S.
 Summerfield School (Oklahoma)
 The former school Summerfields, St Leonards-on-Sea